Maurnikovskaya is a rural locality (a village) in Verkhovskoye Rural Settlement, Tarnogsky District, Vologda Oblast, Russia. The population was 14 as of 2002.

Geography 
Maurnikovskaya is located 39 km west of Tarnogsky Gorodok (the district's administrative centre) by road. Kuzminskaya is the nearest rural locality.

References 

Rural localities in Tarnogsky District